Thomas Morley (1557/8–1602) was an English composer.

Thomas Morley may also refer to:
Thomas Morley, 4th Baron Morley (1354–1416), baron in the Peerage of England
Thomas Morley, 5th Baron Morley (1393–1435), baron in the Peerage of England 
Thomas Morley (bishop) (died 1561), Bishop of Marlborough, 1537–1561
Thomas Morley (cricketer) (1863–1919), English first-class cricketer for Nottinghamshire
Thomas Morley (1513–1559), MP for Arundel